Golden Grove railway station served the estate of Golden Grove, Carmarthenshire, Wales from 1865 to 1963 on the Llanelly Railway.

History 
The station opened on 1 June 1865 by the Llanelly Railway. The station closed to both passengers and goods traffic on 9 September 1963. The site is now a private residence.

References

External links 

Disused railway stations in Carmarthenshire
Former London and North Western Railway stations
Railway stations in Great Britain opened in 1865
Railway stations in Great Britain closed in 1963
1865 establishments in Wales